Albania competed at the 2011 World Aquatics Championships in Shanghai, China between July 16 and 31, 2011.

Swimming

Albania qualified 3 swimmers.

Men

Women

See also
Albania at the 2010 European Aquatics Championships
Albania at the 2012 Summer Olympics

References

Nations at the 2011 World Aquatics Championships
2011 in Albanian sport
Albania at the World Aquatics Championships